Grand River Dam may refer to:

Caledonia Dam in Ontario, Canada
Pensacola Dam in Oklahoma, United States

See also
Grand River (disambiguation)